The  is one of the most important raised bogs under nature conservation in the Ore Mountains of Central Europe.

Location 
The raised bog is located at an elevation of 950 metres above sea level (NN) in a high forest clearing southwest of Carlsfeld. The border between Germany and the Czech Republic runs through the reserve. West of the Kranichsee is the "black pond".

Name 
The name of the bog is related to the Slavic word granica, which means border.

Significance 
It is a watershed and krummholz bog that is drained to the northwest by the Große Pyra and to the southwest by the Rolava. To the east is the Kleiner Kranichsee, where the heart of the bog, unlike the Großer Kranichsee, lies on the German side of the border.

Vegetation 
Mountain pine (Pinus mugo)
Hare's-tail cotton-grass (Eriophorum vaginatum)
Black crowberry (Empetrum nigrum)
Bog bilberry (Vaccinium uliginosum)
Bog rosemary (Andromeda polifolia)

Fauna 
 European viper (Vipera berus)
 Viviparous lizard (Lacerta vivipara)

Tourism 
As early as 1900 the Ore Mountain Club branch at Carlsfeld laid a corduroy road into the bog and erected an observation platform that has since disappeared. The raised bog is protected as a nature reserve.

Literature 
 Der Große Kranichsee. In: A. Marx: Bunte Bilder aus dem Sachsenlande, Vol. IV, pp. 1–6, Dresden, 1927.
  pp. 172–176.

Kranichsee, Grosser
Bogs of Saxony
BKranichsee Grosser
BKranichsee, Grosser